Real Time with Bill Maher is an American television talk show that airs weekly on HBO, hosted by comedian and political satirist Bill Maher. Much like his previous series Politically Incorrect on Comedy Central and later on ABC, Real Time features a panel of guests who discuss current events in politics and the media. Unlike the previous show, guests are usually better versed in the subject matter: more experts such as journalists, professors, and politicians participate in the panel, and fewer actors and celebrities are included.

Real Time is a weekly hour-long program with a studio audience. It used to air live on Friday nights at 10:00pm ET but beginning with Season 20 (January 2022), it is pre-recorded at 7:00pm ET. It originates from Studio 33 ("The Bob Barker Studio") at Television City in Los Angeles. In addition, a 10- to 15-minute "Overtime" segment quickly follows the show on YouTube (Live Streams), which answers questions posted by viewers through HBO's online website for the show.

In September 2021, HBO announced that the show had been renewed for two additional seasons, keeping the show on the air through 2024. The show's twenty-first season premiered on January 20, 2023. From February 3, 2023, the post-show Overtime segment was added to CNN Tonight programming.

Format
The format of the show usually features an opening current events or political skit, followed by the credits and a comedy monologue. Maher then interviews an important figure via satellite or in-studio before sitting down with the panel guests for an extensive debate. Halfway through the panel session, Maher does a comedy skit that usually satirizes current news items. Following the comedy bit, Maher interviews another figure via satellite or in-studio. The format varies, with two or three people on the panel. Maher explains that the format is not rigid and that they prefer live interviews to satellite interviews. Near the end of every episode, Maher has a segment called "New Rules" which serves as a humorous editorial on popular culture and American politics. The final "New Rule" segues into Maher's closing editorial monologue.

Since the show airs on HBO, the participants do not have to restrict their language to conform to the broadcast standards that existed on Politically Incorrect. Also, pictures shown on New Rules sometimes have nudity or uncensored images.

In the first season, Paul F. Tompkins was featured as a correspondent. Also, every episode would end with a performance by a stand-up comedian, none of which were political satirists. The segments featuring Tompkins and comedians were dropped after the tenth episode. Viewers were also able to call into the live show in the first season and ask questions over the air, but this was also dropped.

Starting with episode 67 in February 2006, audio-only episodes were made available as a free podcast via the iTunes Store and as a raw RSS feed. The podcasts also feature material cut from the show but taped during the studio rehearsal, including New Rules not aired in the final version.

During the fall of 2006, Maher began hosting a live chat (now called "Overtime") on HBO's website following each broadcast, usually including some of the show guests. Viewers are invited to submit questions prior to and during the original telecast for Maher and the guests to answer and discuss afterwards. It is also available on the show's YouTube channel.

The opening sequence begins with a spoken phrase from the (now defunct) Los Angeles speaking clock, featuring an (uncredited) Joanne Daniels as the time lady saying "Good Afternoon". The theme song is composed by Christopher "Kid" Reid and his voice is heard saying "Start the clock", "Real Time" and "Bill Maher". A montage of historical events from the beginning of time to election night on November 4, 2008, accompanies the music along with a crawl at the bottom listing the guests for that night's show. According to HBO the show received an average of 4million viewers per week in 2014 and 2015.  2019 ratings posted below were more in the 1.5 million viewer range.

Politics and current events

Maher has been a critic of the Obama administration, the Bush administration and the Trump administration. His panel attempts to present a diverse set of views. Frequently, it consists of a liberal commentator or political figure, a conservative commentator or political figure, and a third individual who does not have as clear an ideological label, or someone with moderate beliefs. This third individual is often an actor, comedian, musician or other entertainment figure, though many times the commentator is openly conservative or liberal.

On his previous TV series, Politically Incorrect, he used the word "libertarian" to describe his political leanings. Regarding religion, he considers himself a "rationalist", as someone "preaching the gospel of 'I don't know. Maher identifies himself as politically unaffiliated and disagrees with the Republican party on many issues, and with the Democratic Party on many of their party platform's planks. He endorsed the candidacy of Ralph Nader of the Green Party in the US presidential campaign of 2000. After the 2000 election, Maher was among those who felt that votes cast by progressives for Nader possibly cost Democratic candidate Al Gore the election, and put GeorgeW. Bush in the White House. During an episode on which Nader and Michael Moore were guests, both Maher and Moore begged Nader not to run again in 2004 (season 2, episode 11). He endorsed Democratic presidential candidate John Kerry leading up to the 2004 presidential election. In 2008, he endorsed Democratic presidential candidate Barack Obama and harshly criticized Republican candidate John McCain's political campaign. He also heavily criticized McCain's vice presidential pick, Sarah Palin, on her qualifications and intelligence. Maher interviewed then presidential-candidate, Republican Ron Paul, giving him some positive air time. He often cites Paul's views in order to demonstrate the diversity of views on the right.

Maher has strong opinions on US drug policy, advocating for the legalization of marijuana. He is against censorship, often citing his own dismissal from ABC and the backlash against the Dixie Chicks for their comments on the Iraq War. He is also against conservative attitudes towards sex and sexuality, mocking outrages over the Clinton–Lewinsky scandal and Janet Jackson's "wardrobe malfunction". He is also not shy about his lack of religious beliefs and he frequently criticizes religion. He is widely known for his support of animal rights groups such as PETA. Hot-button political issues such as health care, corporate influence in government, illegal immigration, the environment, entitlement programs, and human service regulations are frequently discussed on the show.

Christine O'Donnell
On September 17, 2010, Maher aired a clip of Delaware Republican Senatorial candidate Christine O'Donnell from the October 29, 1999, episode of his prior TV series Politically Incorrect, where she discussed that she had "dabbled in witchcraft".  This was perhaps the most notable of numerous controversial statements by O'Donnell that made her the most covered candidate in the 2010 mid-term election cycle.  O'Donnell went on to film a rebuttal commercial claiming "I'm not a witch, I'm you." This ad inspired many video parodies and O'Donnell later said that the ad backfired and focused attention on her decade-old statement. O'Donnell lost to her Democratic opponent, Chris Coons, in the general election. On the September 7, 2012, episode of Real Time with Bill Maher, O'Donnell appeared on the show for the first time and resolved the issue with Maher, who apologized for the amount of publicity that the clip garnered. Maher said that he would not have aired the clip if he knew that it would have taken away from the message of her campaign.

Changes in 2008
The show returned on January 11, 2008, and began broadcasting in high definition, with updates to the set for HD display.

As a result of the writers' strike, in Season 6, the opening skit, the "New Rules" segment, and the closing monologue were eliminated for five episodes at the beginning of the year. The ice breaker used in the middle of the show (normally a fake products sketch tying into a current event) was also eliminated due to the strike. The announcement that Real Time would return without writers indicated that the opening monologue would also be cut, but every episode included a full monologue. The initial season finale of Season Five was to air on November 9, 2007, and was to feature Ben Affleck, George Carlin, and Tom Brokaw as guests, but was canceled due to the strike.

During the strike, the "Overtime" concept became part of the live show itself, through a new segment called "Blogga, Please!". Using HBO's website, viewers were able to leave comments or questions during the live show. Maher and the panel then responded to selected postings at the end of the show. The "Blogga, Please!" segment was discontinued, and "New Rules" brought back, on February 15 following the resolution of the strike. Additionally, during the strike, Maher aired pre-recorded interviews by himself with everyday people about the election and other issues after the opening monologue.

Established early on, the final "New Rule" served as a segue into the closing monologue. On the March 7 episode, the closing monologue returned to the format of the show. The opening skits did not reappear, except for April 4 and 11, 2008.

Instead of doing a second satellite interview near the forty-minute mark, the January 11 episode also featured the debut of the "Real Time Real Reporter", a blogger or political pundit who is brought on midway through the show as an extra panelist to offer opinions on the latest election campaign happenings. Such correspondents have included Matt Taibbi, Frank Luntz, Amy Holmes, P. J. O'Rourke, and Dan Savage.

Changes in 2009
The 2009 premiere was on February 20 at the earlier time of 10:00pm EST. The opening sequence was also slightly changed to include then President-elect Barack Obama and his family waving to a crowd of supporters on election night in November 2008.

Also, the show aired one continuous season as opposed to airing episodes in the spring and fall with a summer break in between.

For a short time the Real Time panel was reduced from three panelists to two for the new season. Maher jokingly attributed the new panel line-up to the economic crisis, stating that it was a means of reining in spending for the HBO show; Maher later stated that there is no connection between the failing economy and the producers' decision to remove the third guest. During his show on March 13, 2009, Maher reacted to the confusion sparked by his remarks from his previous show regarding the panel stating, "I said as a joke that we had cut down the panel to two people because of economic times, and people took me seriously. No. It's just because I'm tired of talking to three people sometimes." The panel was once again at three panelists for the show one week later, on March 20. In addition to the panel reconfiguration, Maher has instituted a one-on-one in-studio interview segment in lieu of the past seasons' satellite interviews. The interview with James Carville on the May 8 show, however, was conducted via satellite.

Changes in 2012
HBO renewed the show on April 24, 2012, for two more seasons through 2013–14. The first episode of Season 11 aired on January 18, 2013, retaining its format of an initial monologue from Maher, a one-on-one interview with a guest, then turning to a discussion panel of three guests, and ending with "New Rules".

A new addition to the format is that of a fourth or "mid-guest", who comes in at approximately the halfway point of the show, bringing their own issue to the table and discussing it with the entire panel.

Changes in 2017
In 2017, Real Time debuted a new theme song and a new set. The new theme song continues in the path of its predecessor by showcasing important political events including the election of Donald Trump as the 45th President of the United States. The new season retained the basic format of the showa top-of-the-show guest, a table discussion and a mid-show guest. The biggest change in terms of set design has been that the main table where Bill Maher and two or three guests discuss current political events is moved closer to the audience after the top of the show interview is completed. In addition to this, some mid-show guests including Leah Remini, Jake Tapper, Ralph Reed and Barbra Streisand have been interviewed on a separate side table. Though mid-show guests like Remini and Tapper have not taken part in any discussion on the main show after their interview or appeared on Overtime, the segment which is broadcast on YouTube, other guests like Reed have.

Changes in 2020 to 2023 (in response to COVID-19)
During the COVID-19 pandemic, Real Time moved from Studio 33 to being taped from Maher's home in Beverly Hills with guests appearing remotely from the April 3, 2020, episode to August 23, 2020. Bill Maher and his production team returned to their usual studio on August 28, 2020, their first show produced back in studio since March 2020. Changes to production were made for the return to the studio, with no live studio audience, the continuation of using a fake laugh track and archive clips of audiences applauding and laughing during Maher's opening monologue, along with social distancing of the crew and interviews with guests via the internet/satellite connections. Since February 5, 2021, the show has allowed regular audience attendees in the studio who have tested negative for COVID-19.

Beginning with the April 3, 2020, episode of Season 18, until the August 21, 2020, episode, Real Time with Bill Maher had temporarily adjusted its format. All the episodes from this period were filmed from Maher's home starting with a monologue either from Maher's garden, elsewhere on the grounds of his property, or the living room. The duration of the show consisted of three to four in-depth guest interviews instead of the long-form panel discussion as guests appeared remotely while Maher records the discussion from his "man cave" or from his garden. The show ended with "New Rules" from Maher's garden. There was no "Overtime" segment.

On August 28, 2020, Bill Maher returned to the studio, but with no audience and guests appearing remotely over a video screen. From September 11, 2020, to October 30, 2020, and November 13, 2020, a limited audience was brought in with some guests appearing remotely while others are in studio. November 6, 2020, featured the first show with a limited audience, mainly the staff writers, and all guests appearing in studio. A format that has been done consistently since the Season 18 finale on November 20, 2020, into Season 19. Since February 5, 2021, of Season 19, the show has allowed regular audience attendees in the studio who have tested negative for COVID-19. After the monologue, Maher speaks with the first guest appearing in studio sitting in the armchairs moved six feet apart across from another. The panel discussion involves two guests sitting six feet apart from one another across from Maher at the discussion table. And no "Overtime" segment.

The season 19 episode scheduled for May 14, 2021, was canceled after Maher tested positive for COVID-19 during the show's weekly testing for COVID. The episode was to feature Neil deGrasse Tyson, Max Brooks, and Dan Carlin as guests. The following May 21 show was cancelled as a precaution.
 	
For season 20, the show does not air live, rather it is pre-recorded at 7:00 pm ET with the 10:00 pm ET airing unchanged with the same three guest format from the previous season. "Overtime" returned on January 21, 2022, following the season premiere. Instead of the usual four guests format, it is the three guests, the first guest interviewed after the monologue, and the two guests who sit with Maher at the discussion table during the rest of the show. This format has continued into season 21.

Episodes

Reception

Critical response
The response to the first season was mostly mixed. On Metacritic, it has a score of 43% based on reviews from 5 critics, indicating "mixed or average reviews". Nancy Franklin of The New Yorker said "There’s also more of Maher in the new show, and it’s no big surprise that more Maher is less. He’s a jerk of the old school, full of unexamined anxiety and arrogance, with a habit of using sexual stereotypes from half a century ago both to put down and to compliment people." The New York Times called the show "Fox News of the antiwar movement" and described it as "a flagrantly liberal talk show that provides like-minded viewers with instant gratification."

Television host Larry King called Real Time "one of the best shows on television". Maher was a regular guest on Larry King Live as well as co-host at various times, and co-emcee of the final show, along with Ryan Seacrest.

Common Sense Media's website says, "Comedian Bill Maher is very funny, very well-informed, and very insightful, but he's also very crass."  It later says, "Maher also expects his audience to have plenty of tolerance for blue humor. His jokes are profane and riddled with explicit sexual references, and he often pokes fun at the use and abuse of alcohol and other intoxicants. It's funny, but it's very much aimed at adults."  The site gives Real Time with Bill Maher an "overall quality" rating of 4 out of 5 stars.

Ruthless Reviews was also positive, saying, "Maher's show is as good as ever, which means that the sacred and the profane continue to be discussed with intelligence, humor, and the occasional silliness" and that it "works so well because he selects provocative guests and I can't remember the panel ever having a dull conversation. Maher is smart and witty (and clearly in control), which means that he won't let his guests get away with bullshit."

Bibliography
Two books by Maher based on the show have been published:
 New Rules: Polite Musings from a Timid Observer (Rodale Books, 2005)
 The New New Rules: A Funny Look at How Everybody but Me Has Their Head Up Their Ass (Blue Rider Press, 2011)

Award nominations
The show was nominated for a Primetime Emmy Award for Outstanding Variety Series every year from 2005 through 2014 and for a Primetime Emmy Award for Outstanding Variety Talk Series in 2016 and 2017.

See also
 Politically Incorrect
 Inside Washington
 Agronsky & Co.
 Washington Week
 Gordon Peterson

References

External links

 
 

2003 American television series debuts
2000s American political comedy television series
2000s American satirical television series
2000s American television talk shows
2010s American political comedy television series
2010s American satirical television series
2010s American television talk shows
2020s American political comedy television series
2020s American satirical television series
2020s American television talk shows
HBO original programming
English-language television shows
Liberalism in the United States
Political satirical television series
Progressivism in the United States
Television shows filmed in Los Angeles
Bill Maher